Sergio Casal and Emilio Sánchez were the defending champions, but did not participate this year.

Andreas Maurer and Jörgen Windahl won the title, defeating Gustavo Luza and Gustavo Tiberti 6–4, 3–6, 6–4 in the final.

Seeds

  Dan Cassidy /  Mel Purcell (first round)
  Gustavo Luza /  Gustavo Tiberti (final)
  Ronnie Båthman /  Carlos di Laura (semifinals)
  Nelson Aerts /  Luiz Mattar (semifinals)

Draw

Draw

References
Draw

1986 in Swiss sport
1986 Grand Prix (tennis)
1986 Geneva Open